Drone Activity is the third live album from the experimental electronic band Ulver. It was released on May 11, 2019.

Track listing

References

External links
 

Ulver albums
2019 live albums